Solanum abutiloides is a species of plant in the family Solanaceae. It is also known as dwarf tamarillo, due to superficial similarities with Solanum betaceum. Both plants are noted for very rapid growth from seed, and very strongly fragrant foliage. Solanum abutiloides is also sometimes known by the archaic Cyphomandra sibundoyensis.

Small flowers form on branches throughout the plant, and individual clusters of flowers can contain as many as 60 blooms.

Blooms are followed by fruits - a small oblong berry that ripens to a yellow-orange color. When unripe, the berries are mildly toxic (as are tamarillos), though they are edible upon ripening.

Uses 
The fruits are edible, though Solanum abutiloides is rare in cultivation and plants have not been bred for quality of flavor.  Therefore, the fruit can often have an unpredictable or unpleasant flavor, and Solanum abutiloides is most often cultivated as an ornamental plant, as the clusters of ripe fruit are very decorative.

As is common with Solanaceae, pests like aphids, spider mites, and white flies are attracted to the trees.

References

External links 
 

Edible Solanaceae
Flora of Argentina
Flora of Bolivia
Tropical fruit
Vulnerable plants
abutiloides